On 18 June 2022, the Oromo Liberation Army (OLA) was accused of massacring over 500 Amhara civilians in the Gimbi county of Oromia Region, Ethiopia. Witnesses said that the OLA intentionally targeted ethnic Amhara people. This attack is part of a series of Amhara massacres that occurred in 2022.  

A witness told the Associated Press he had counted at least 230 bodies and said he was "afraid this is the deadliest attack against civilians we have seen in our lifetime" and that mass graves were being dug for victims. One resident told reporters that the death toll surpassed 260 people, while others placed it higher at 320.

The government blamed rebels, and witnesses accused the Oromo Liberation Army (OLA) for carrying out the attack in Tole and surroundings, but the OLA denied that their troops were present, and put the blame on the government forces. The Government of Oromia however confirmed that an attack had occurred. The government was accused of not eliminating threats as OLF due to involvement in scheme.

Background 
In the 1990's, the TPLF, a predominantly Tigrayan militia, overthrew the Ethiopian government and held power until 2018, when ethnic Oromo Abiy Ahmed won the election. Tensions between the TPLF, now a political party in the Tigray region, and Ahmed's government grew until it reached a boiling point in late 2020 that began the Tigray War. Since then, both the Ethiopian government and TPLF have been accused of war crimes in the Tigray region, with spillovers in the Amhara Region and Oromia. 

The TPLF went on an offensive in summer 2021, allying with the ethnocentrist Oromo Liberation Front against the Ethiopian government. This heavily increased the OLA's participation in the war, and the OLA has been accused of persecuting ethnic Amhara in the Oromia region.

Massacre 
Around June 17, residents said that security forces in Tole left the area without explanation. On the morning of June 18, the OLA, allegedly aided by ethnic Oromo in the area, sought out ethnic Amhara in ten villages across Gimbi woreda in Western Oromia. The perpetrators predominantly used machine guns to kill their victims, but machetes, mass executions, and immolation were also used. 55 people were executed in a village outside the village of Chefie, and two massacres took place in the village of Silsaw; 14 women and children were killed in a vacant home in the town, and over 48 people were killed in the town's mosque. Similarly, 13 Amhara were charred in the villages of Gutin Sefer and Silsaw.

Looting also occurred in the aftermath of the massacre, with one witness stating "everything was damaged."

The Gimbi massacre is the deadliest massacre in the West Welega Zone of Ethiopia in recent years, and was harshly criticized by the Ethiopian government.

Witnesses told Human Rights Watch (HRW) that the perpetrators spoke Oromo and some had a distinctive hairstyle common among OLA fighters. They said the attackers wore a mix of civilian clothes and uniforms worn by the Oromia regional special forces and local militias as well as outdated Ethiopian National Defense Force (ENDF) uniforms. Government security forces arrived in the area after the perpetrators had left despite multiple calls for assistance. The massacre took place over the span of eight hours.

Satellite imagery confirmed the burning of at least 5 villages and 480 civilian structures.

Reaction

Foreign governments

US 
The spokesperson for the US State Department, Ned Price, issued a statement on the victims of the attack and urged peaceful solutions and accountability on human rights. The Embassy of United States to FDRE reiterated the message which the State Department's spokesperson issued. The US Ambassador to the United Nations, Linda Thomas-Greenfield, also issued a separate messaging condemning the attacks on civilians and urging a peaceful solution. She said "We continue to call for all Ethiopians to choose peace, not violence. And we continue to call for comprehensive, inclusive justice for victims and accountability for those who have carried out human rights abuses and violations."

Iran 
The Iranian Ministry of Foreign Affairs also condemned the attack calling it a "terrorist" attack by armed insurgent groups.

Ethiopia 
The Prime Minister Abiy Ahmed condemned the attacks on innocent civilians calling it "unacceptable." Two days after the attack famous Ethiopian singer Teddy Afro released a song "Na'at" ("unleavened bread") which  reflects "the dark time of Ethiopia". According to HRW, as of 31 August 2022 the government had failed to provide adequate shelter, food, medical care, and security for the affected communities. Residents said little had been done to investigate the massacre and bring perpetrators to justice.

United Nations 
The Secretary-General of the United Nations António Guterres condemned the massacre stating, "The secretary-general condemns the reported killing of scores of civilians in Oromia this weekend," said Stephane Dujarric, chief spokesman for Guterres."

See also
 Qelem Wollega massacre
 Hachalu Hundessa riots
 Gawa Qanqa massacre

References

2022 mass shootings in Africa
2022 murders in Ethiopia
21st-century mass murder in Ethiopia
June 2022 crimes in Africa
Mass shootings in Ethiopia
Massacres in 2022
Massacres in Ethiopia
Oromia Region
Oromo Liberation Front
Terrorist incidents in Africa in 2022
Terrorist incidents in Ethiopia
Massacres of Amhara people